Sandwich was a parliamentary constituency in Kent, which elected two Members of Parliament (MPs) to the House of Commons from 1366 until 1885, when it was disfranchised for corruption.

History
Sandwich like most of the other Cinque Ports, was first enfranchised in the 14th century. As
a Cinque Port it was technically of different status from a parliamentary borough, but the difference was in most respects purely a nominal one. (The writ for election was directed to the Lord Warden of the Cinque Ports, rather than the sheriff of the county, and its MPs were termed "barons" rather than "burgesses" as in boroughs.) Until 1832, the constituency consisted of the three parishes making up the town of Sandwich; it had once been a flourishing port but by the 19th century the harbour had silted up and there was only a limited maritime trade.

The right to vote was reserved to the freemen of the town, whether or not they were resident within the borough. In 1831 this amounted to 955 qualified voters, of whom only 320 lived in Sandwich. The freedom could be obtained by inheritance, by serving an apprenticeship, or by marrying the daughter or widow of a freeman; the corporation apparently did not, as in some boroughs, have the power to create unlimited numbers of honorary freemen so as to swamp the rights of the genuine freemen. At one period in the 17th century, the town corporation attempted to annex the right of voting to itself (as was the case in many other boroughs) on the grounds of "the avoidance of popular tumults common at elections", and in 1621 the Lord Warden ordered with the consent of the Privy Council that this should be so. However, the inhabitants of the town not only petitioned against the election result, but informed the Lord Warden that they intended to present a bill to Parliament to annul the result of that year's election and to restore their former privileges. In the event the petition against the election result was upheld and the election declared void, and a decision of the Commons in another dispute election, in 1690, confirmed that the right of voting was in the freemen.

For most of its existence, no single interest had a predominant influence in Sandwich so as to reduce it to a pocket borough, but the power of official patronage sometimes exerted some leverage. In Tudor times, the Lord Warden expected to be able to nominate one of the two MPs, but - unlike most of the other Cinque Ports - Sandwich consistently defied him, and made its own choice of both MPs throughout Queen Elizabeth's reign. In the 18th and 19th centuries, though, the influence of the navy (through the employment it provided) was sufficient that the Admiralty could be sure of choosing at least one MP at most elections. Nevertheless, Sandwich fell short of being a true "Admiralty borough", and generally elected members who would benefit the town. (They were, however, no less venal than in other boroughs: the committee investigating a disputed election in 1695 was told that the elected member had promised that if after election he were to gain paid office he would give half his salary to the corporation, that he would contribute £20 a year for the poor of the town and a treat to the corporation on the anniversary of his election.)

In 1831, the population of the constituency was 3,084, and the town contained 610 houses. This would not have been sufficient for the borough to retain both its MPs under the Great Reform Act, but the boundaries were extended so as to include the neighbouring towns of Deal and Walmer, which quadrupled the population. Even so, and despite the extension of the franchise, the revised constituency had only 916 qualified voters for the 1832 general election.

At a by-election in 1880, evidence of widespread bribery in Sandwich emerged. Its writ was suspended, and a Royal Commission appointed to investigate. It was found that out of an electorate of 2115, 1850 voted, of whom 900 admitted they had been bribed and 100 admitted they had bribed. As a result of its report, Sandwich was abolished as a constituency with effect from 25 June 1885, being incorporated into the Eastern Kent county division.

Members of Parliament

1366–1640

1640–1885

Notes

Election results

Elections in the 1830s

 

 
 

 
 
 

 

 

 

 

Troubridge was appointed a Lord Commissioner of the Admiralty, requiring a by-election.

 
 
 

Rivett-Carnac resigned after being appointed Governor of Bombay, requiring a by-election.

Elections in the 1840s
Donkin's death caused a by-election.

Elections in the 1850s
Grenfell resigned in order to contest a by-election at Windsor, causing a by-election.

 
 

 

 
  
 
 

 
  
 
 

Knatchbull-Hugessen was appointed a Lord Commissioner of the Treasury, requiring a by-election.

Elections in the 1860s

 
 
 

Paget resigned, causing a by-election.

Elections in the 1870s

Elections in the 1880s

Hugessen resigned in advance of being elevated to the peerage, causing a by-election.

A Royal Commission found proof of extensive bribery and the writ was suspended, with the by-election result being voided. The writ was never returned and the constituency was merged into East Kent on 25 June 1885, before that seat was then abolished for the 1885 general election.

References

Sources

Robert Beatson, A Chronological Register of Both Houses of Parliament (London: Longman, Hurst, Res & Orme, 1807) 
D Brunton & D H Pennington, Members of the Long Parliament (London: George Allen & Unwin, 1954)
Cobbett's Parliamentary history of England, from the Norman Conquest in 1066 to the year 1803 (London: Thomas Hansard, 1808) 
 J. E. Neale, The Elizabethan House of Commons (London: Jonathan Cape, 1949)
 T. H. B. Oldfield, The Representative History of Great Britain and Ireland (London: Baldwin, Cradock & Joy, 1816)
 J Holladay Philbin, Parliamentary Representation 1832 - England and Wales (New Haven: Yale University Press, 1965)
 Edward Porritt and Annie G Porritt, The Unreformed House of Commons (Cambridge University Press, 1903)

Parliamentary constituencies in Kent (historic)
Constituencies of the Parliament of the United Kingdom established in 1366
Constituencies of the Parliament of the United Kingdom disestablished in 1885
Parliamentary constituencies disenfranchised for corruption
Cinque ports parliament constituencies